OutRun 2006: Coast 2 Coast is a racing game developed by Sumo Digital and published in 2006 by Sega AM2. It is the 9th title in the series, and the final one to have a physical release. Outrun 2006 is an updated version of OutRun 2. The game is split into two parts: a conversion of OutRun 2 SP (which itself includes the OutRun 2 levels) and "Coast 2 Coast", which includes single-player races and challenges, and local network and internet multiplayer.

OutRun 2006 was released in  Europe and North America on the Xbox, PlayStation 2 and PlayStation Portable in March–April 2006, but was delayed until June for PC. In Japan, OutRun 2006 has only seen a PlayStation 2 release, albeit retitled as OutRun 2 SP. Each version is subtly different so as to play to the strengths of its home system, which includes a link-up feature between the PS2 and PSP versions, a different mission set for the PSP and Xbox Live support on the Xbox.

The game featured an online mode for up to six players. The online service for the PC, PS2 and PSP versions of the game was discontinued in May 13, 2009. The Xbox Live servers went offline on April 15, 2010 due to the discontinuation of Xbox Live for Xbox.

Gameplay
Cars have varying classes ranging from Novice to Professional, with increased top speeds and diminished handling as the difficulty rises. New to the OutRun series is the addition of a separate "OutRun" class, which applies to every car and allows each car to have increased performance in all aspects; cosmetic changes including racing stripes and decals as well as completely renovated bodywork are also evident.

OutRun 2006: Coast 2 Coast features 15 different cars, the most ever seen in any OutRun game. In addition to the ten vehicles from OutRun 2 SP, new models include the 550 Barchetta, F355 Spider, Superamerica, 328 GTS and the Ferrari F430. Some models cannot be unlocked on the PlayStation Portable or PlayStation 2 without the use of the cross-system connectivity feature inherent of the two systems (as a result of PSP connectivity being removed from the Japanese PS2 version, all PSP unlockables are included in the Japanese PS2 version from the start) or cheat codes.

Coast 2 Coast mode is the game's "career" mode, in which there are many challenges (labeled as "missions") to complete, ranging from racing rivals for the top position to thrilling player's passenger by completing their requests to execute certain driving maneuvers or tests of memory and logic. The racing modes from OutRun 2 SP ("OutRun race", "Heart attack" and "Time attack") are still available, while adding four extra modes exclusive to the Coast 2 Coast mode:
 Test Your Drift: A one-on-one race with the objective of accumulating points by drifting through bends.
 Test Your Slipstream: The player must drive behind traffic vehicles to collect the points and beat rivals.
 Avoid the Knockout: An elimination race, the last-placed car at the end of each stage is automatically ejected from the challenge.
 Do Not Lose Your Girlfriend: Another one-on-one duel, but here the player must stay ahead of the rival couple until their "heart points" reach 0.
When the game is started for the first time, a limited selection of cars, tracks, challenges and background music is available. Each individual element can be unlocked through the exchange of "OutRun Miles", which are points that players score for progression through Coast 2 Coast mode or normal game, but the race does not need to be finished to earn OutRun Miles. Some unlockables are missing in Coast 2 Coast compared to Outrun 2, namely the original Outrun from 1986 and the bonus tracks from Daytona USA 2 and Scud Race/Super GT.

Reception

The game was met with positive reception. It has a score of 83% and 81 out of 100 for the PC version, 83% and 82 out of 100 for the PSP version, 80% and 81 out of 100 for the PlayStation 2 version, and 77% and 77 out of 100 for the Xbox version according to GameRankings and Metacritic.

In 2014, Edge ranked the game at #71 on its list of "The 100 Best Games to Play Today", stating that "sun-seekers and joyriders call it home, its crystal lakes and epic drifts an escape from war-torn deserts and space marines". In a 2017 special edition of the same magazine, listing their 100 top videogames of all time, OutRun 2006 was one of only two racing games on the list, along with Trials Fusion.

References

External links
 

2006 video games
Multiplayer and single-player video games
OutRun
PlayStation 2 games
PlayStation Portable games
Racing video games
Sumo Digital games
Video games developed in the United Kingdom
Video games scored by Hiroshi Kawaguchi
Video games scored by Richard Jacques
Video games set in Chile
Windows games
Xbox games